Doridoxidae, commonly known as doridoxid nudibranchs, are a small, enigmatic taxonomic family of shell-less sea slugs, marine  gastropod molluscs in the clade Cladobranchia within the clade Nudibranchia.

Doridoxidae is currently the only family in the superfamily Doridoxoidea, within the clade Pseudoeuctenidiacea (= Doridoxida). Molecular evidence shows that it groups with the genera Doridomorpha and Heterodoris and the family Arminidae and close to Tritoniidae.

Genera 
The family Doridoxidae is a small family with only one genus Doridoxa and two species:
 Doridoxa benthalis Barnard, 1963
 Doridoxa walteri (Krause, 1892)

Species brought into synonymy:
 Doridoxa ingolfiana Bergh, 1899 - the type species of Doridoxa; synonym of Doridoxa walteri.

References